= Operation Sustainable Human =

2019 non-fiction book by Chris Macdonald

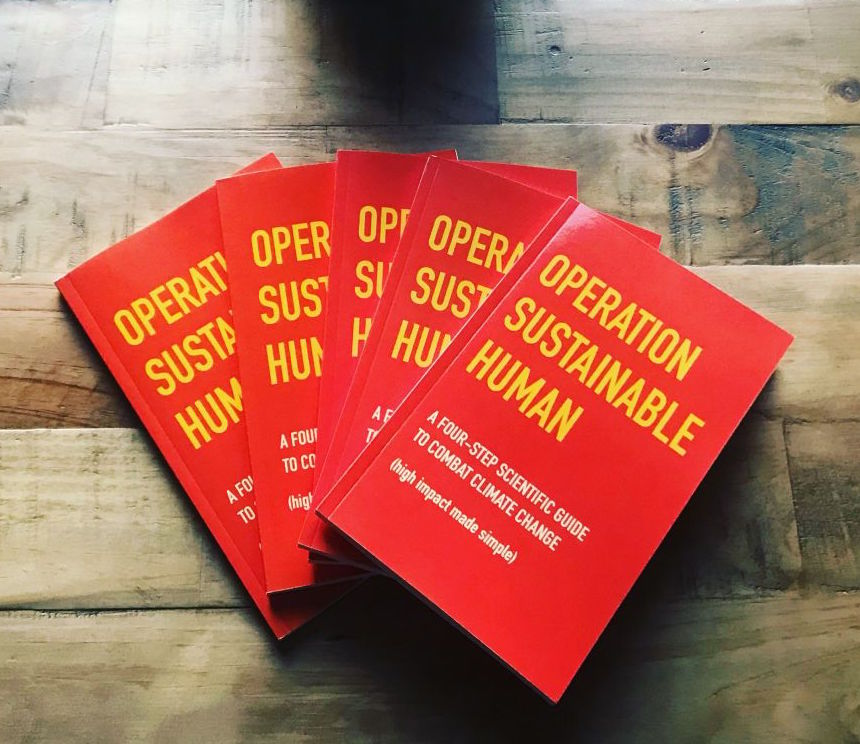
- Author: Dr Chris Macdonald
- Language: English
- Genre: non-fiction
- ISBN: 978-1-7752528-3-2

Operation Sustainable Human is a 2019 book by Chris Macdonald about optimised climate action. The book briefly outlines the main challenges of climate change and largely focuses on the most impactful climate solutions.
